The Jeanneau Brio is a French trailerable sailboat that was designed by Philippe Harlé as a pocket cruiser and first built in 1979.

The Brio is a development of the 1971 Jeanneau Love Love, incorporating a new raised deck design.

Production
The design was built by Jeanneau in France, starting in 1979, but it is now out of production.

Design
The Brio is a recreational keelboat, built predominantly of fiberglass. It has a masthead sloop rig. The hull has a raked stem, a reverse transom a transom-hung rudder controlled by a tiller and a fixed fin keel or stub keel and retractable centerboard. The boat is normally fitted with a small outboard motor for docking and maneuvering.

The design has sleeping accommodation for four people, with a truncated double "V"-berth in the bow cabin and two straight settees in the main cabin around a table. The galley is located on both sides just aft of the bow cabin, with a single burner stove to port and a sink to starboard.

Variants
Brio fixed keel
This fixed keel model displaces  and carries  of ballast.
Brio centerboard
This stub keel and centerboard model displaces .

See also
List of sailing boat types

Related development
Jeanneau Love Love

References

External links

Keelboats
1970s sailboat type designs
Sailing yachts
Trailer sailers
Sailboat type designs by Philippe Harlé
Sailboat types built by Jeanneau